The Mbwasa language is a Southern Bantoid language of Cameroon. It is very similar to Ki, and is sometimes considered a dialect of it.

References
 Blench, Roger, 2011. The membership and internal structure of Bantoid and the border with Bantu. Bantu IV, Humboldt University, Berlin.

Mbam languages
Languages of Cameroon